Duinviridae is a family of RNA viruses, which infect prokaryotes.

Taxonomy 
Duinviridae contains 6 genera:
 Apeevirus
 Beshanovirus
 Kahshuvirus
 Kohmavirus
 Samuneavirus
 Tehuhdavirus

References 

Virus families
Riboviria